Deh Gel Kan (also Romanized as Deh Gelkan) is a village in Bikah Rural District, Bikah District, Rudan County, Hormozgan Province, Iran. At the 2006 census, its population was 936, in 211 families.

References 

Populated places in Rudan County